DDRMAX Dance Dance Revolution 6thMix is the 6th game in the Dance Dance Revolution series of music video games. It was released in the arcades by Konami on October 19, 2001, and for the PlayStation 2 on May 16, 2002, in Japan. 6thMix contains a total of 42 songs, all which made their first arcade appearance on this release. 11 of these songs debuted in various console releases prior to 6thMix. All arcade songs from Dance Dance Revolution to Dance Dance Revolution 5thMix were removed in 6thMix, although many of the Konami originals from those games would later be revived in future arcade releases.

Gameplay

The interface used is a recoloring and smoothing of the song wheel interface first introduced in Dance Dance Revolution 5thMix, with the addition of changeable sort settings and a longer time limit. Core gameplay remained mostly the same on 6thMix and 7thMix, with the addition of Freeze Arrows and a new scoring system:

Freeze Arrows appear as green arrows with a long extension. If they are held for the entire length successfully, a O.K. is scored. If it is not held down for the entire length, a N.G. (no good) is scored. Freezes affect the life bar. Scores are calculated with 2 distinct scoring systems, the long-score system used to determine rankings, and an independent dance point system (known on later games as EX SCORE) now used to determine the grade.

All songs have a long-score ceiling of 50 million points, and a bonus score is tacked onto it based on the difficulty of the song and other factors. Rankings are given for the highest long-score accumulations a round. If a player plays more than three songs, then it only counts the last three played. If a song is played repeatedly among the three songs used for ranking, then the repeated songs carry no bonus score.

The dance-point system uses raw step values to determine the grade. A 'perfect' step adds two points, a 'great' step adds one point, a 'good' step is worth nothing, a 'boo' step takes away four points, and a 'miss' step takes away eight points. An 'O.K.' freeze adds six points, and an 'N.G.' freeze is worth nothing. The dance points are also tied to the life bar. As always, if a player takes too many bad steps and depletes the life bar, they will fail, and the game will end immediately. If the first song is in Light mode, then the game will allow a player to fail that song and continue, but will fail the player out if they fail a second song. In two-player games, if one player fails, they can continue dancing, but it ceases to accumulate dance points for the failed player, accumulates score points at only 10 points per step, and automatically gives the failed player an 'E' for the song.

The grade is dependent on the number of dance points accumulated: 100% dance points is 'AAA', at least 93% is 'AA', at least 80% is 'A', at least 65% is 'B', at least 45% is 'C' and anything below 45% is a 'D'. If a net dance-point total of zero is obtained without depleting the life bar and, thus, failing, an 'E' is awarded. The final grade for the entire game is an average of the grades from the last three songs and not derived from the actual dance points scored.

This 2-tiered scoring system is still utilized on DDRMax2, though the long-score system is reformed. For the long-score system in DDRMax2, it now has a maximum for each song of 10,000,000 multiplied by the foot rating for the routine. Maximum scores can range from 10 million to 100 million for individual songs. Bonus scores are abolished, though the new long-score system tends to be weighted so that errors early in a routine are not as costly as errors late. The dance point system, which determines grade, remains unchanged. This scoring system would be kept for Dance Dance Revolution Extreme.

6thMix was intended to be the Next Generation of Dance Dance Revolution. As such, there are many changes. First, the difficulty levels were renamed. 'Basic' was renamed 'Light', 'Trick' was named 'Standard', and 'Maniac' was named 'Heavy'. They are also given Japanese difficulty names in conjunction: 楽 (raku), 踊 (you), and 激 (geki), respectively.  Their color codes—orange, fuchsia and green, respectively—remain the same. Also, all songs from previous versions have been removed in 6thMix (although the prototype version of this game had some songs from previous DDR versions), intending the game to start from scratch. Many past songs do return on 7thMix and later releases, however.

Interface and graphics
Dancing characters have been removed in 6thMix, 7thMix and Extreme. Instead, the arrows scroll over clips of full motion video, hence the game does not render any polygons. The screen refreshes at a full speed of 60 frames per second. In addition, the arrows themselves have been tweaked too, now having a rounded edge on their outer tip rather than the V-shaped cut used in all previous games.

These games retain the Song Wheel interface introduced in 5thMix, but add an easier method to enter modifiers. In previous versions, modifiers like "Sudden" or "Shuffle" required a combination of dance steps. Beginning in 6thMix, a player only needs to hold the Start button when they select a song to bring up a full menu of available modifiers, including the ability to speed up or slow down the scrolling of arrows, and a final chance to select the song difficulty they wish to play.

Modifiers

A new options menu accessed by holding down the Start button when selecting a song debuted on 6thMix, and is retained on future mixes.

Some of the available modifiers include Speed mods, which change the arrow speed. Boost, which causes the arrows to accelerate as they near the step zone, Appearance, which changes the appearance of the arrows. Turn mods modify the stepchart itself, Other affects the difficulty of the steps, Scroll changes the scroll direction of the arrows, and Freeze Arrows can also be turned off.

Extra Stage
New to 6thMix is the "Extra Stage", where players are rewarded for meeting conditions set by the game. If a AA is scored on the final stage on Heavy mode, a message inviting the player to "Try Extra Stage" is shown instead of the Cleared graphic. For the Extra Stage, the song wheel is locked on "MAX 300", and the song is played with several forced modifiers, including 1.5x speed and Reverse. The song is also played in Pressure mode, where the dance gauge starts filled, and can only go down.

If the player scores a AA or higher on the Extra Stage the game again rewards them with "One More Extra Stage". This time, the song wheel is locked to "CANDY☆", an easier song but with more difficult Modifiers. The exact same modifiers are used, but the song is played in Sudden Death mode, where any step judgment which breaks a combo immediately ends the game. If the player clears the song with a full combo (which is the only way to do so in Sudden Death mode), a special credits movie is shown. When this second Boss Song is passed for the first time it too will be unlocked for normal play, also displayed on the Song Wheel in red.

Link data
Some machines have the ports to insert PlayStation memory cards. Such memory cards have to be original PlayStation (not PS2) memory cards with Link Data from the home version of DDR 5thMix (the home version of 6thMix cannot create arcade-compatible Link Data). 5thMix can create two different kinds of arcade link data; the Link Data file for 6thMix is known as "New Version" Link Data and is forward-compatible with 7thMix arcade machines as well. Link Data serves two primary purposes: Score-saving and Internet Ranking. The user can save his or her scores from arcade performances, and whenever the game is played in the future, the arcade game will load the scores for each user and show them on the song-selection screen to show the player's best performances. These scores can also be viewed at home with 5thMix. 6thMix also provides Internet Ranking codes based on the user's performance in a given set of songs. As with all of Konami's Internet Ranking events, the website for the game would allow users to enter in a generated password which contains their initials and scores for that session, and the website would display the rankings for those who have submitted codes. Link Data saves these passwords so that they may be entered much more conveniently.

The arcade game can exchange custom stepchart data with 6thMix, as well as any earlier version that has songs that are in 6thMix, though this requires special steps to be taken in 6thMix to write a PlayStation-formatted save file, which must then be copied to the PlayStation memory card by the user.

Release

Home versions
The home version of DDRMAX Dance Dance Revolution 6thMix was released in Japan on May 16, 2002, for the Sony PlayStation 2 video game console. It featured all 42 songs from the arcade version as well as two additional console-exclusive songs "Kind Lady" and "So In Love".  6thMix's hidden songs can be unlocked automatically, without additional play, by accessing its save data on home versions of DDRMAX2 Dance Dance Revolution 7thMix or Dance Dance Revolution Extreme.

DDRMAX Dance Dance Revolution, with the mix number omitted, is the home version released in North America for the PlayStation 2 video game console. The North American version is considerably different from the Japanese version.  It displays song difficulties using the traditional foot-rating system and the Groove Radar in tandem.

Sequel

DDRMAX2 Dance Dance Revolution 7thMix is the seventh game in the Dance Dance Revolution series of music video games. It was released in Japanese arcades by Konami on April 17, 2002, though bootleg installations are available internationally. The Japanese release of DDRMAX2 contains a total of 135 songs, with 53 of these making their first arcade appearance on this release. This game was rated 8.5/10 stars by IGN.

Dancing Stage EuroMix 2 is an arcade variant of DDRMAX2 for the European market. It has fewer features and a reduced soundtrack of 68 songs. Dancing Stage MegaMix was released exclusively for the PlayStation 2 in Europe and Australia, and this game also uses the DDRMAX2 engine.

DDRMAX2 Dance Dance Revolution is a game for the PlayStation 2 in North America.

Music
DDRMAX includes 42 songs in the arcade release, and 44 songs in the Japanese PlayStation 2 release. DDRMAX2 includes 135 songs in the arcade release, and 74 songs in the Japanese PlayStation 2 release.

Notes:
 † This song's title contains an in-game typo. The correct name is "Little Boy (Boy Oh Boy Mix)".
 ‡ This song's artist name contains an in-game typo. The correct artist is Scooch.
 🔷 This song is exclusive to DDRMAX in arcades.
 🔶 This song is unavailable in the PlayStation 2 version.
 💚 This song is exclusive to DDRMAX and DDR Extreme in arcades.

The North American version of DDRMAX is exclusive to the PlayStation 2. It features a total of 71 songs, with 13 Konami originals (including both Boss songs and both console exclusives) and one license ("Ordinary World" by Aurora featuring Naimee Coleman) shared in common with the Japanese version. The remaining songs consist of 50 Konami originals from various sources, 5 console exclusive licenses, and 2 licenses from prior arcade releases. The North American version also features a Nonstop mode, with 6 courses consisting of 5 to 21 songs each.

Nonstop Challenge

Nonstop Challenge was introduced in the arcade version of DDRMAX2, which features 18 courses with songs in the Standard, Heavy and Challenge difficulties. In this arcade release, the Challenge difficulty is exclusive to the Nonstop Challenge mode, and there are 19 songs which solely feature a Challenge difficulty. All 19 songs involve Naoki Maeda.

Beginning with Dancing Stage EuroMix 2, the songs "B4U (B4 ZA Beat Mix)" and "Hysteria 2001" can be played individually, with the Challenge steps available in Expert mode. This is also the sole arcade release to offer three easier difficulties for each song, although Double mode omits the easiest of these, which is Beginner. From Dance Dance Revolution Extreme to Dance Dance Revolution SuperNova 2, all 19 songs can be played individually, with only Challenge steps available. 17 of the 19 songs remain in subsequent releases.

Eight of the 18 Nonstop Challenge courses from DDRMAX2 return in Dance Dance Revolution Extreme, with the Marvelous judgment enabled, and with "Kakumei" featuring Dark and Reverse modifiers on Demon Road 2.

Subsequent arcade games have also introduced special Challenge charts or songs:
 Dance Dance Revolution SuperNova 2 features six Groove Rader Special charts.
 Dance Dance Revolution X features 17 X-Special charts.
 Dance Dance Revolution X2 features 7 Chinese Challenge songs.

Notes for Nonstop Challenge:
 † "Dynamite Rave (B4 ZA Beat Mix)" made its final appearance in Dance Dance Revolution X in Asia, Dance Dance Revolution SuperNova 2 in North America, and Dance Dance Revolution SuperNova in Europe
 ‡ "Matsuri Japan (fron Nonstop Megamix)" made its final appearance in Dance Dance Revolution X.
 🎬 This song includes a music video in Dance Dance Revolution Extreme 2, Dance Dance Revolution SuperNova, and subsequent arcade releases.

Reception

The PlayStation 2 release of DDRMAX Dance Dance Revolution received favourable reviews. GameSpot gave it a 7 out of 10 rating. IGN gave it a 9.3 out of 10. Its sequel, DDRMAX2 Dance Dance Revolution, also received "generally positive" reviews according to video game review aggregator Metacritic.

By July 2006, the PlayStation 2 version of DDRMAX2 Dance Dance Revolution 7thMix had sold 750,000 copies and earned $28 million in the United States. Next Generation ranked it as the 84th highest-selling game launched for the PlayStation 2, Xbox or GameCube between January 2000 and July 2006 in that country. Combined sales of Dance Dance Revolution released between those dates reached 5 million units in the United States by July 2006.

References and notes
Notes

References

External links
DDRMAX Dance Dance Revolution 6thMix official website 
DDRMAX2 Dance Dance Revolution 7thMix website 

2001 video games
Arcade video games
Dance Dance Revolution games
PlayStation 2 games
Video games developed in Japan